Greatest Hits is a compilation and the third greatest hits album from The Jam, released in 1991. It includes all of the band's eighteen hit singles plus "Precious" (which was released as a double A-side along with "Town Called Malice"). It includes two singles, "That's Entertainment" and "Just Who Is the 5 O'Clock Hero?", which made the UK charts without ever being released there, they charted after being heavily imported from Europe. It has a companion album of rarities, titled Extras. It was released in 1992.

Track listing
"In the City"
"All Around the World"
"The Modern World"
"News of the World"
"David Watts"
"Down in the Tube Station at Midnight"
"Strange Town"
"When You're Young"
"The Eton Rifles"
"Going Underground"
"Start!"
"That's Entertainment"
"Funeral Pyre"
"Absolute Beginners"
"Town Called Malice"
"Precious"
"Just Who Is the 5 O'Clock Hero?"
"The Bitterest Pill (I Ever Had to Swallow)"
"Beat Surrender"

References

The Jam albums
1991 greatest hits albums
Polydor Records compilation albums